Hieracium crepidispermum is a North American plant species in the tribe Cichorieae within the family Asteraceae. It is widespread across much of Mexico and found also in the US states of Arizona and New Mexico.

One stalk will produce 8-25 flower heads in a flat-topped array. Each head has 25–40 white or pale yellow ray flowers but no disc flowers.

References

crepidispermum
Flora of Mexico
Flora of the Southeastern United States
Plants described in 1848
Flora without expected TNC conservation status